Damascus is a city in Early County, Georgia, United States. The population was 254 at the 2010 census.

History
An early variant name was Kestler. An act of Georgia General Assembly officially changed the name to Damascus in 1914. The present name is a transfer from nearby Old Damascus, which was bypassed when the railroad was built through the area.

An EF2 tornado struck the area south of town, causing major damage and injuring five people.

Geography

Damascus is located in eastern Early County at  (31.298580, -84.717429). Georgia State Route 45 passes through the community, leading north  to Arlington and south  to Colquitt. Georgia State Route 200 also passes through the center of town, leading east  to Newton and northwest  to Blakely, the Early County seat.

Demographics

As of the census of 2000, there were 277 people, 100 households, and 74 families residing in the town. The racial makeup of the town was 36.10% White, 63.54% African American, and 0.36% from two or more races.

There were 100 households, out of which 31.0% had children under the age of 18 living with them, 41.0% were married couples living together, 24.0% had a female householder with no husband present, and 26.0% were non-families. 19.0% of all households were made up of individuals, and 12.0% had someone living alone who was 65 years of age or older.  The average household size was 2.77 and the average family size was 3.16.

In the town the population was spread out, with 30.3% under the age of 18, 8.3% from 18 to 24, 27.8% from 25 to 44, 21.7% from 45 to 64, and 11.9% who were 65 years of age or older.  The median age was 34 years. For every 100 females, there were 93.7 males.  For every 100 females age 18 and over, there were 87.4 males.

The median income for a household in the town was $28,333, and the median income for a family was $19,318. Males had a median income of $31,500 versus $19,286 for females. The per capita income for the town was $12,583.  About 31.4% of families and 23.5% of the population were below the poverty line, including 20.3% of those under the age of eighteen and 61.9% of those 65 or over.

Education

Public school students are zoned to the Early County School District which operates three schools in Blakely: Early County Elementary School, Early County Middle School, and Early County High School.

Damascus is home to Southwest Georgia Academy, which was founded in 1970 as a segregation academy and participates in the Georgia Independent School Association. Its property formerly housed Damascus High School.

Gallery

Notable people
 Robbie Robinson, bodybuilder, actor, three-time Mr. Universe overall winner
 Shawn Williams (American football), football player, Atlanta Falcons

References

Cities in Early County, Georgia
Cities in Georgia (U.S. state)